Kevarrius Hayes (born March 5, 1997) is an American-Central African professional basketball player for Žalgiris Kaunas of the Lithuanian Basketball League (LKL) and the EuroLeague. He played college basketball for the Florida Gators.

Early life and high school
Hayes was born and grew up in Live Oak, Florida and attended Suwannee High School. He was student body president. Ranked the 58th-best college prospect by ESPN.com for his class, Hayes committed to play college basketball at the University of Florida as a sophomore in high school. He was named second team Class 5A All-State in both his junior and senior seasons.

College career

Hayes was a member of the Florida Gators for four seasons. He played mostly as a backup center during his true freshman season, starting six of 35 games played, and averaged 2.8 points and 2.6 rebounds per game. He saw more playing time and became a starter for the team towards the end of his sophomore season, averaging 6.3 points and 4.4 rebounds per game and led the team with 60 blocked shots. 

As a junior, Hayes averaged 4.8 points and five rebounds over 33 games played (25 starts) and again led the team and finished 5th in the Southeastern Conference (SEC) with 67 blocks. In his senior season, Hayes set career highs with 8.3 points and 6.3 rebounds per game over 36 games, starting all but one, and led the team a third straight year with 67 blocks (3rd in the SEC). He finished his collegiate career with averages of 5.6 points, 4.6 rebounds, and 1.5 blocks per game in 140 games played (82 starts). His 214 career blocks were the second most in Gators history.

Professional career

Cantu (2019–2020)
On July 8, 2019, Hayes signed with Pallacanestro Cantù of the Italian Lega Basket Serie A. In his first professional season, Hayes averaged 9.6 points, 7.3 rebounds and led Serie A with 2.6 blocks per game and was named honorable mention All-Serie A by Eurobasket.com.

ASVEL (2020–2021)
On June 8, 2020, Hayes signed a one-year deal with ASVEL of the French LNB Pro A.

Bursaspor (2021–2022)
On July 2, 2021, Hayes signed with Frutti Extra Bursaspor of the Turkish Basketbol Süper Ligi (BSL). In 53 games played for Bursaspor, Hayes averaged 9.4 points, 6.5 rebounds, 1.1 steals and 1.3 blocks per game.

Žalgiris (2022–present)
On July 29, 2022, Hayes signed a one-year contract with Žalgiris Kaunas of the Lithuanian Basketball League (LKL), with an option for an additional year.

National team career
Hayes was on the roster for the Central African Republic national basketball team for AfroBasket 2021.

References

External links
Florida Gators bio
EuroBasket profile
EuroLeague profile
RealGM profile

1997 births
Living people
American expatriate basketball people in France
American expatriate basketball people in Italy
American expatriate basketball people in Lithuania
American expatriate basketball people in Turkey
American men's basketball players
ASVEL Basket players
Basketball players from Florida
BC Žalgiris players
Bursaspor Basketbol players
Naturalized citizens of Central African Republic
Central African Republic men's basketball players
Centers (basketball)
Florida Gators men's basketball players
Lega Basket Serie A players
Pallacanestro Cantù players
People from Live Oak, Florida